Cayo Coco  was an airport in Cayo Coco, Cuba that served as the main airport of the island until it was superseded by the Jardines del Rey Airport, which opened in 2002. The former runway of the airport was incorporated as the new route of a highway heading west connecting Cayo Coco with Cayo Guillermo, although some runway markings and taxiways remain visible. The airport terminal buildings and surrounding area have been reclaimed as a small natural park called Parque Natural El Baga.

References

External links

Defunct airports
Airports in Cuba
Airport, Cayo Coco
Buildings and structures in Ciego de Ávila Province